Joseph Berton Germaine (born November 16, 1975) is a former American football quarterback. He was drafted by the St. Louis Rams in the fourth round of the 1999 NFL Draft after playing college football at Ohio State.

Germaine earned a Super Bowl ring with the Rams in Super Bowl XXXIV, beating the Tennessee Titans, and he also has been a member of the Kansas City Chiefs, Cincinnati Bengals, San Diego Chargers, and Utah Blaze.

Early years
Germaine attended Mountain View High School in Mesa, Arizona, and was a letterman in football, basketball, and baseball. He became a starter midway through his junior year and set school records with 3,782 passing yards, a 59% completion percentage, and 39 touchdown passes. As a senior, he connected on 123 of 209 passes for 2,081 yards and 23 touchdowns. He was drafted by the Colorado Rockies as a high school baseball prospect.

College career
Germaine was recruited by Northern Arizona University (NAU) out of high school, but NAU was wary of his intention to serve a two-year Mormon mission, and thus did not offer him a scholarship.  Germaine played one season (1995) at Scottsdale Community College in Arizona before transferring to Ohio State. In 1996 and 1997 he was the backup to quarterback Stanley Jackson, but saw significant playing time as the two shared QB duties. Germaine’s most memorable moment in his years as a backup came at the 1997 Rose Bowl. He led the Buckeyes on a 65-yard drive in 12 plays in the final 1:40 for the winning touchdown against Arizona State, a five-yard pass to David Boston with 19 seconds left. Germaine passed for 131 yards in the game and was named the game’s MVP.

In his senior year (1998) at Ohio State, Germaine was a full-time starter at quarterback, as well as a team co-captain. That year, he set 11 school records, throwing for 3,330 yards and 25 touchdowns. He was the Chicago Tribune Silver Football Award winner as well as the Big Ten Conference Most Valuable Player that year. He threw for 6,370 yards and 56 touchdowns in three seasons.

Germaine was selected to the Ohio State Football All-Century Team in 2000.

Statistics

Professional career

Pre-draft

St. Louis Rams
Germaine was selected in the fourth round (101st overall) of the 1999 NFL Draft by the St. Louis Rams. He won a Super Bowl ring as a backup to Kurt Warner as a rookie. Germaine appeared in only three games, completing nine passes, and was cut at the end of the 2000 season.

Kansas City Chiefs
Germaine appeared in three games with the Kansas City Chiefs in 2001. He was waived on September 1, 2002.

Cincinnati Bengals
Germaine was signed to the practice squad of the Cincinnati Bengals on October 17, 2002. He was promoted to the active roster on December 12 and served the remainder of the season as the third-string quarterback. He was released on April 23, 2003.

Germaine worked out for the Seattle Seahawks in August 2003, but was not signed and spent the rest of the season out of football.
Germaine was signed by the San Diego Chargers on August 6, 2004, but was waived prior to the regular season on August 26.

Arizona Rattlers
In 2004 Germaine became a quarterback for the Arizona Rattlers of the Arena Football League, where he was a back-up to Sherdrick Bonner.

Utah Blaze
After two seasons and six starts with the Rattlers, Germaine joined the expansion Utah Blaze in 2006. He started the first nine games of Utah's inaugural season, passing for 2,330 yards and 41 touchdowns while completing 67.4 percent of his passes. His season was cut short by an injury, but he returned in 2007 as the full-time starter. He became the first player in league history to pass for over 5,000 yards in a season. He finished with 5,005 yards, surpassing the record of 4,841 yards set by San Jose's Mark Grieb in 2006.

Arizona Rattlers (second stint)
In October 2008 Germaine opted out of his contract with the Blaze in hopes of returning to the Rattlers. Germaine re-joined the Rattlers prior to their first season in the newly founded Arena Football 1. He was, however, quickly placed on "reassignment" on February 5, 2010.

Coaching career
After being placed on reassignment, Germaine accepted the head coaching job at Queen Creek High School in Queen Creek, Arizona. Athletic Director Paul Reynolds was familiar with Germaine, having played for ASU against him in the 1997 Rose Bowl. Prior to coaching at Queen Creek, Germaine was the quarterbacks coach at Chandler's Basha High School from 2004 until 2007.

In 2012, Germaine's Bulldogs appeared in the Arizona Division III state championship, against Desert Edge High School. With twelve seconds left and the game tied at 7, the snap for a Desert Edge punt was high, sailing over the punter, who picked up the ball and was tackled in the back of the end zone for a safety. Queen Creek won its first state championship 9-7 and finished an undefeated season.

References

External links
 Arena Football League bio
 Arizona Rattlers bio
 Ohio State Buckeyes bio

1975 births
Living people
American football quarterbacks
Ohio State Buckeyes football players
St. Louis Rams players
Kansas City Chiefs players
Barcelona Dragons players
Cincinnati Bengals players
San Diego Chargers players
Arizona Rattlers players
Utah Blaze players
Players of American football from Denver